The name Kulap has been used for four tropical cyclones in the western north Pacific Ocean. The name was contributed by Thailand and means "rose". It was spelt Kularb until a 2002 update by the World Meteorological Organization (WMO).

 Severe Tropical Storm Kulap (2005) (T0501, 01W) – remained over the open ocean.
 Tropical Storm Kulap (2011) (T1114, 17W, Nonoy) – passed through the Ryukyu Islands.
 Tropical Storm Kulap (2017) (T1706, 09W) – remained over the open ocean.
 Severe Tropical Storm Kulap (2022) (T2217, 19W) – remained over the open ocean.

Pacific typhoon set index articles